Karma dance or Karma Naach is a traditional dance of central and Eastern India annually performed during the karma festival.  Karma is a famous autumnal festival, it starts from the 11th day of the bright fortnight of the month of Bhadrab. It is performed in State of   Chhattisgarh, Jharkhand, Madhya Pradesh, Odisha and West Bengal.
Karma means 'fate'.

This folk dance is performed during the worship of the god of fate which is known as Karam Devta. People consider the god of fate as the cause of good and bad fortune.

See also 
 Karam festival

References

Odia culture
Dances of India